A Japanese Nightingale is a 1918 American silent drama film adapted from the Onoto Watanna novel, directed by George Fitzmaurice and starring Fannie Ward, W.E. Lawrence and Yukio Aoyama.

Cast
 Fannie Ward as Yuki 
 W.E. Lawrence as John Bigelow 
 Yukio Aoyama

References

Bibliography
 Jay Robert Nash, Robert Connelly & Stanley Ralph Ross. Motion Picture Guide Silent Film 1910-1936. Cinebooks, 1988.

External links
 

1918 films
1918 drama films
1910s English-language films
American silent feature films
Silent American drama films
American black-and-white films
Films directed by George Fitzmaurice
1910s American films